The 2010 Miller Superbike World Championship round was the seventh round of the 2010 Superbike World Championship season. It took place on the weekend of May 29–31, 2010 at Miller Motorsports Park, in Tooele, Utah, United States.

Results

Superbike race 1 classification

Superbike race 2 classification

Supersport race classification

External links
 The official website of the Superbike World Championship

Miller Round
Miller Superbike